Dutch Mill (Thai: ดัชมิลล์, pronounced [datɕʰ mil]) is one of the largest producers and distributors of dairy products.It was established in 1984 under the name of Pro Food Company Limited and changed its name to Dutch Mill Company Limited in 1991. It has 3 subsidiaries and 4 main groups of products. Dutch Mill aims to offer the greatest dairy products in Asia over the course of many years in the industry and has researchers that focus on the development and improvement of the original products in terms of deliciousness, flavor and texture. Dutch Mill has established a solid dedication to and aim to offer the greatest dairy products in Asia over the course of many years in the industry. Thais founded and now runs the business, which continually upholds human resource development as a catalyst for increased productivity and competitiveness in order to achieve its ultimate aim of gratifying clients and dominating the worldwide scene. The foundation for all of this is a strong feeling of social duty.

History 
Dutch Mill Company Limited was founded on January 27, 1984, on behalf of "Pro Food Company Limited." Milk has been predicted by a group of food experts from Kasetsart University(Thai: มหาวิทยาลัยเกษตรศาสตร์; RTGS: Mahawitthayalai Kasetsat), to offer several health advantages for both men and women. All ages may contribute to the growth and development of the agricultural economy and rural life. As a result, dairy products are being developed for Thai people's health. involves the manufacture of ready-to-drink curd, yogurt, and dairy products Under the name "Dutch Mill," the company began as a tiny factory in Klong Kum(Thai: คลองกุ่ม, pronounced [kʰlɔ̄ːŋ kùm]) Cooperative Village in Bangkok, making yogurt in 4 flavors: orange, strawberry, pineapple, and natural taste.

In order to manage or take care of the same as pasteurized and UHT milk products, Dutch Mill Company Limited was established in 1991 to establish "Dutch Mill Company Limited," which was subsequently divided into two businesses, Dutch Mill Company Limited and Pro Food Company Limited. The corporation buys quotas of raw milk from farmers since it is the main raw material used in manufacture.

The first dairy factory for the Dutch Mill opened its doors on Phutthamonthon Sai 8 Road(Thai: พุทธมณฑล, pronounced [pʰút.tʰā.mōn.tʰōn] in the province of Nakhon Pathom(Thai: นครปฐม, pronounced [náʔkʰɔ̄ːn pā.tʰǒm]). The Dutch Mill immediately became well-known and in high demand as a result of its reputation and appeal. Increased customer demand and the desire to keep bringing new items to market. The items are pasteurized yogurt from Dutchmill that is ready to consume. The three most popular ones are Dutch yogurt, Dutch mill fresh milk, and Delight fermented milk.

Company Information

Mission 
1. Aim to develop production and distribution processes with modern technology and technology.

2. Aim to meet the needs of customers by researching and developing new products to the market.

3. Focus on developing employees at all levels to be efficient. by promoting and sharing learning across the organization

4. Treat stakeholders such as shareholders, employees, customers, suppliers and communities fairly.

5. Social responsibility by reducing the generation of pollution that is toxic to the environment. and support the community

Organizational objectives 
To produce yogurt and ready-to-drink yogurt products quality homemade form And the variety is comparable to leading yogurt shops. and to raise the standard of yogurt and ready-to-drink yogurt.

Vision 

 Satisfying customers with excellent products and services.
 Elevate employees' abilities through continuous learning and practice.
 Focus on continuous process improvement to achieve superior organizational competitiveness.

The Dutch Mill Group Company will focus on "quality" in all circumstances that might have an impact on our clients. We shall also adhere to the following three key guiding principles:

 Dedicate to Excellence
 Maximization of Customer Satisfaction
 Continuous Improvement

Departments and duties

Accounting Department 
            Responsible for all types of receipts and payments keep money Conducting various tax matters, closing accounts, checking and preparing invoices transfer voucher and account transfer notification Prepare daily cash balance report cash flow statement Estimated income and expenses Financial statements and details of financial statements.

Personnel Department 
             Has the duty to recruit and hire personnel Develop, evaluate and improve the quality of personnel to be effective. Check the time in and out of employees Determine compensation for working directly and allocate indirect benefits to personnel in a standardized manner Provide welfare and compensation.

Sales Department 
            Has a duty to provide services to sell products to customers. The sales department will collect the information of customers who come to order and order information explaining the details of the products that the customers are interested in.

Public Relations Department 
            It is responsible for studying the organization's work or products, policies, objectives and desired goals. make public relations to obtain information for use in planning and conducting public relations Public relations to build trust for the company and the product. Make a customer satisfaction assessment.

Warehouse Department 
            Has a duty to plan to check the system for receiving all the products, including the number of products Goods quality, finished goods storage and general storage system within the stock. Allocate space to store raw materials or goods. Approve documents for goods issued in and out of the warehouse. Supervise the movement of goods by reviewing relevant documents. With trading, the rules about the safety of warehouse management.

Maintenance Department 
            Has the duty to set the policy and plan for the management of all maintenance work in the company / factory, both mechanical and electrical, supervising preventive maintenance work, to check the condition of the machine to be able to use it, and maintain it to be able to support the production effectively and efficiently.

Factory 
The inauguration of Dutch Mill's first facility on Buddhamonton 8 Road(Thai: พุทธมณฑล, pronounced [pʰút.tʰā.mōn.tʰōn] followed a brief period of rapid growth in the company's popularity. To improve production and meet growing demand, the firm created new product lines, such as Dutch Mill pasteurized drinking yogurt and UHT drinking yogurt.
After seeing substantial success in Bangkok with direct sales utilizing what later came to be known as "Dutch Mill women," who were entrusted with promoting wholesome Dutch Mill products to local customers, the firm decided to extend to regional markets.

The company built its second site in Nakhon Sawan(Thai: นครสวรรค์, pronounced [ná(ʔ).kʰɔ̄ːn sā.wǎn])  in 1997 as a consequence of its continually rapid expansion, and to increase its effectiveness and competitiveness, it also used top-tier management strategies including MRPII, SAP, TQM, and TPRM.

A wide range of Dutch Mill's goods are now imported by several ASEAN countries, including Singapore, China, Brunei, Vietnam, the Philippines, Malaysia, Indonesia, Laos, Cambodia, and Burma. The company also intends to expand fast abroad.

Product

UHT Milk 
 Tasma Farm (SKU’s available : Full cream milk, Chocolate flavored Milk)
 Nutritional Value
High Calcium
Phosphorus
Vitamin B2
Vitamin B12

UHT Drinking Yogurt 
 UHT Yoghurt Drink “Dutch Mill” (SKU’s available : Orange, Mixed Fruit, Strawberry and Blueberry)
 Nutritional Values
High Nutrition from fresh cow’s milk
Delicious with real fruit juice
Enriched with Calcium
Cultured with Lactobacillus Bulgaricus and Streptococcus thermophilus
Contain Amino Acid
High in Vitamin such as B1, B2, and D

UHT Soy Milk 
 SOY SECRETZ Black Sesame(SKU’s available : Soy Milk with Black Sesame)
 Nutritional Value
 Sesamin & Sesamolin : cholesterol-lowering effect & prevent high blood pressure
 High Calcium & 0% Cholesterol
 Low Saturated Fat

 SOY SECRETZ Germinated Rice(SKU’s available : Soy Milk with Black Sesame)
 Nutritional Values
 GABA from geminated rice : brain chemical that helps to relax brain and be more productive.
 Vitamin B12: plays a key role in the normal functioning of the brain and nervous system, and for the formation of blood
 Omega 3,6,9: help to increase your concentration

 SOY SECRETZ Corn(SKU’s available : Soy Milk with Black Sesame)
 Nutritional Values
 Vitamin A and Lutein are found promoting eyesight and vision

 SOY SECRETZ Collagen(SKU’s available : Soy Milk with Collagen)
Nutritional Values
Collagen with a quantity of 14,487 microgram/brik promotes skin radiance and elasticity
Grape seed extract with anti-oxidants helps fight aging.
Vitamin E moistures and brighten skin.

UHT Choco Malt Drink Chocolate Flavour 
 UHT Choco Malt Drink Chocolate Flavour DMALT(SKU’s available : Chocolate Malt , Chocolate Malt Low Sugar)
 Nutritional Values
 Double Calcium formula to help strengthen bone and teeth
 High in Vitamin B – contains Vitamin B 1,2,3,5,6,9,9,12
 Total of 16 vitamins and minerals for kids’ total development
 Delicious taste with real Chocolate Malt

Drinking Yogurt 
 Available
 Dutch Mill Drinking Yoghurt Strawberry
 Dutch Mill Drinking Yoghurt Blueberry
 Dutch Mill Drinking Yoghurt Orange
 Dutch Mill Drinking Yoghurt Mixed Fruit
 Dutch Mill Drinking Yoghurt Kyoho Grape
 Dutch Mill Drinking Yoghurt Mixed Berries

Drinking Yoghurt 0% Fat 
 Available
 Dutch Mill Drinking Fermented
 Dutch Mill Drinking Yoghurt Strawberry
 Dutch Mill Drinking Yoghurt Mixed Fruit Vegetable Flavor

Cup Yoghurt 
 Available
 Dutchie Original Yoghurt
 Dutchie Yoghurt With Strawberry
 Dutchie Yoghurt With Cereal beans and lotus nuts
 Dutchie Yoghurt With Mixed Fruit
 Dutchie Yoghurt With Nata De Coco

Dutchie Fat Free Yoghurt 
 Available
 Dutchie Fat Free Yoghurt
 Dutchie Fat Free Yoghurt With Nata De Coco
 Dutchie Fat Free Yoghurt With Strawberry
 Dutchie Fat Free Yoghurt With Lychee Aloe vera

Dutchie Bio 
 Available
 Dutchie Bio Original
 Dutchie Bio Strawberry
 Dutchie Bio Nata De Coco

Dutchie Summer 
 Available
 Dutchie Yoghurt With Mango Sticky Rice
 Dutchie Yoghurt With Punch Juice

Dutch Mill Milk 
 Available
 Dutch Mill Selected
 Dutch Mill Selected 0% Fat
 Dutch Mill Selected Strawberry
 Dutch Mill Selected Chocolate
 Dutch Mill Selected White Malt
 Dutch Mill Selected Coffee

Dutch Mill Powdurance 
 Available
 Powdurance White Grape with Redcurrant flavor
 Powdurance White Grape with Mixed fruit flavor

Arabus 
 Available
 Arabus Original
 Arabus Espresso

Company Research

Research Center 
The Dutch Mill Company International Research Center Co., Ltd. was founded with the goal of creating dairy products that emphasize consumer health promotion. goods that adhere to global production norms. 30 researchers collaborate using both basic and applied research concepts. Research on the advantages of deliciousness is also available. and many attributes of each dairy product. Therefore, our researchers' primary responsibility is ongoing development. To the greatest extent feasible, produce dairy products that satisfy customer demands while upholding principles of product safety.

Research and development 
         Research and development is the core work of the agency. DIRC researchers conduct both fundamental and in-depth research. To focus on the development and improvement of existing products in terms of deliciousness, flavor and texture, etc., including the development of new products. that meet the needs of consumers It focuses on the following core research:

             Health products
             Bacteria that are beneficial to the body
             Clinical research
             Food safety
             New innovation

Promote and exchange scientific knowledge 
         These activities include training, seminars and conferences, among others, which are organized to promote knowledge exchange and dissemination of health and nutrition information, organized by in-house researchers. and outside experts in health and nutrition education including monitoring the research situation to keep pace with world-class scientific data

High Standards at Every Turn Making sure "Food Safety"

Dutch Mill's commitment to excellence at every stage of the entire production process—from the dairy farm to the milk transfer station, transportation, raw milk quality assurance procedures, production processes, packaging, and through distribution to customers—has been one of the key drivers of its success. The product is essentially guaranteed to be free of chemical, physical, and biological contamination since every stage is meticulously scrutinized to make sure it conforms with HACCP and GMP requirements.

Dutch Mill has also put in place a distinctive quality control system, which consists of

 Development of raw resources and quality control at the source
 Real-time pro-process inspection
 A quality check of the final product is performed before factory delivery.
 The ability to examine each lot's product quality using logs for referenced goods or quality control.

Business Profit 
Annual growth percentages for the last two years in local currency THB. Absolute financial data is included in the purchased report. (year 2021)

Awards 
By using premium-quality raw materials and upholding strict quality control at every stage of manufacturing, Dutch Mill constantly improves the quality of its products, meeting and even exceeding international standards. With certifications in Good Manufacturing Practice (GMP), Hazard Analysis and Critical Control Point (HACCP), Quality Management of ISO 9001:2008, and Environmental Management of ISO 14001:2004, Dutch Mill's customers can be sure that their milk products are wholesome and are of the highest quality, freshness, safety, and taste.

 Thailand Prime Minister’s Export Award 2001
 Thailand Prime Minister’s Award for Outstanding Quality Management 2002
 Thailand Most Admired Brand
 Reader’s Digest Thailand Trusted Brand Award

References

External links
 Official website
International Company Website
http://dutchmill-pro.blogspot.com/p/dutchmill.html
https://www.emis.com/php/company-profile/TH/Dutch_Mill_Co_Ltd_en_2103595.html

Dairy products companies of Thailand
Companies established in 1984
1984 establishments in Thailand
Thai brands